Calamaria modesta is a dwarf snake species in the genus Calamaria found in Java.

References

 Duméril, A.M.C., G. Bibron & A.H.A. Duméril, 1854. Erpétologie générale ou Histoire Naturelle complète des Reptiles. Vol. 7 (partie 1). Paris, xvi + 780 S.

Colubrids
Reptiles described in 1854
Calamaria
Taxa named by André Marie Constant Duméril
Taxa named by Gabriel Bibron